Haï El Badr is a transfer station serving the Line 1 of the Algiers Metro.

Etymology
This is the only airline metro station of Algiers and it constituted until 2015 the eastern terminus of the line. It is located in the district of the same name, Hai El Badr (ex-Allotment Michel) in the town of Kouba, although administratively the station is located in the territory of the municipality of El Magharia .

Its construction was completed in 2001, it was then composed of two docks. A third platform was built between 2009 and 2012 and equipped 2015 to accommodate the extension to El Harrach Centre.

References

External links
 Algiers Metro Site
 Ligne 1 Algiers Metro on Structurae

Algiers Metro stations
Railway stations opened in 2011
Railway stations in Algeria opened in the 21st century